Knight Without a Country (also known as The Faceless Rider) is a 1959 Italian adventure film directed by Giacomo Gentilomo and starring Gérard Landry and Constance Smith.

Plot

Cast 

 Gérard Landry as  Rolando
 Constance Smith  as Laura
 Alberto Farnese as Rizziero, Duke of Villalta
 Giacomo Rossi Stuart as Ruggero 
 Valeria Fabrizi as Countess of Holten
 Wandisa Guida  		
 Franco Fantasia  		
 Ivano Staccioli  		 
 José Jaspe  		
 Gino Buzzanca  		 	
 Nino Marchesini  		
 Pietro Tordi

References

External links
 
     
1959 adventure films
1959 films
Italian adventure films  
Films directed by Giacomo Gentilomo
1950s Italian films